José Ronaldo do Nascimento (born 16 March 1966) is a Brazilian handball player. He competed at the 1992 Summer Olympics, the 1996 Summer Olympics and the 2004 Summer Olympics.

References

External links
 

1966 births
Living people
Brazilian male handball players
Olympic handball players of Brazil
Handball players at the 1992 Summer Olympics
Handball players at the 1996 Summer Olympics
Handball players at the 2004 Summer Olympics
Handball players at the 2003 Pan American Games
Pan American Games medalists in handball
Pan American Games gold medalists for Brazil
People from Aracaju
Medalists at the 2003 Pan American Games
Sportspeople from Sergipe